Saint-Lô is a commune in the Manche department of France.

St. Lo or Saint-Lô may also refer to:
Laud of Coutances
Saint-Lô station
USS St. Lo
George St Lo
Edward St. Lo
Alexander St. Lo Malet